Pakistan International Screen Awards, also known as PISA, is an annual award ceremony that honours excellence in Pakistani television, film, fashion, music and digital industry.

History 
In 2019, Faisal Khan, the executive producer of the Awards, announced that the first Pakistan International Screen Awards will be held at the Coca-Cola Arena in United Arab Emirates.

Ceremonies

Categories
TBA

Jury
The jury of PISA includes Frieha Altaf, Jawed Sheikh, Saher Sheikh, Alina Talha, Faraz Hamidi, Faisal Javed Khan, Suhail Abdullatif Ibrahim Galadari, Maria Faisal, Waqar Zaka and Omar Alavi.

References

External links
 Instagram

Pakistani television awards
Pakistani film awards
Awards established in 2020
2020 establishments in Pakistan